Doem Bang Nang Buat is a district (amphoe) in the northern part of Suphan Buri province, central Thailand.

History
In the past, Nang Buat District covered a large area. Prince Damrong Rajanubhab and the governor of Suphan Buri agreed to separate the northernmost part and then created a new district named Doem Bang on 16 May 1911. Two tambons of Hankha district, Chai Nat province and two tambons of Bang Rachan district, Sing Buri province were added. In 1939 the government changed the district name of Nang Buat District to Sam Chuk, they decided to put the word Nang Buat after Doem Bang, so since that year the district is named Doem Bang Nang Buat.

Its name literally means 'formerly place of ordained lady', according to folklore from the Sukhothai period.

Geography
Neighbouring districts are (from the north clockwise): Noen Kham, Hankha and Sankhaburi of Chai Nat province; Bang Rachan and Khai Bang Rachan of Sing Buri province; Sawaeng Ha of Ang Thong province; and Sam Chuk, Nong Ya Sai and Dan Chang of Suphan Buri Province.

The main water resource of Doem Bang Nang Buat is the Tha Chin River or Suphan River.

Administration

Central administration 
The district is divided into 14 subdistricts (tambons), which are further subdivided into 121 administrative villages (mubans).

Local administration 
There are eight sub-district municipalities (thesaban tambons) in the district:
 Pak Nam consisting of sub-district Pak Nam.
 Thung Khli consisting of sub-district Thung Khli.
 Nong Krathum consisting of sub-district Nong Krathum.
 Khao Phra consisting of parts of sub-districts Khao Phra, Doem Bang.
 Nang Buat consisting of parts of sub-district Nang Buat.
 Bo Kru consisting of parts of sub-district Bo Kru.
 Khao Din consisting of sub-district Khao Din.
 Doem Bang consisting of parts of sub-district Doem Bang.

There are eight sub-district administrative organizations (SAO) in the district:
 Khao Phra consisting of parts of sub-district Khao Phra.
 Nang Buat consisting of parts of sub-district Nang Buat.
 Khok Chang consisting of sub-district Khok Chang.
 Hua Khao consisting of sub-district Hua Khao.
 Hua Na consisting of sub-district Hua Na.
 Bo Kru consisting of parts of sub-district Bo Kru.
 Pa Sakae consisting of sub-district Wang Si Rat, Pa Sakae.
 Yang Non consisting of sub-district Yang Non.

Places

Wat Nang Buat an ancient local temples that are more than 100 years old but have an unclear history.
Wat Khao Nang Buat is another ancient temple of the district, believed to be the temple of Phra Ajarn Thammachote, a monk in the Ayutthaya period that was respected by the villagers of Bang Rachan. Its name is the origin of the district name.
It is one of the province's most popular tourist attractions. The lake was declared a wildlife sanctuary area in 1983 and the government registered Bueng Chawak as an important wetland under the Ramsar Convention. Currently, there is a zoo, an aquarium with crocodiles pond, the garden of indigenous vegetables, as well as homestays in the atmosphere that is good for supporting visitors.

References

External links
amphoe.com

Doem Bang Nang Buat